Kol Kol may refer to:
 Kalkal (disambiguation)
 Kol Kol-e Olya (disambiguation)